Natural High is an album by jazz guitarist Frank Gambale released on 7 February 2006 by Wombat Records.

Track listing

Personnel
Frank Gambale – guitar, mixing, production
Otmaro Ruíz – piano
Mike Shapiro – percussion
Alain Caron – bass
Robert M. Biles – engineering, mixing
Dave Fredrick – audio editing
Jim Schultz – audio editing
Bill Dooley – mastering

References

Frank Gambale albums
2006 albums